The Probasco-Dittner Farmstead is a historic farmstead in Colts Neck Township, in Monmouth County, New Jersey, United States. It has been listed on the National Register of Historic Places since February 1, 2006.

References

Colts Neck Township, New Jersey
Houses on the National Register of Historic Places in New Jersey
Colonial architecture in the United States
Houses completed in 1735
Houses in Monmouth County, New Jersey
National Register of Historic Places in Monmouth County, New Jersey